Subhen Chatterjee is an Indian  percussionist and tabla player. Chatterjee began his training on the tabla in his childhood, studying with Swapan Chaudhuri. In 1985 he created the fusion band Karma. He has accompanied the vocalist Girija Devi on several recordings including Songs of Varanasi for Nimbus Records. He has also recorded with V.M. Bhatt and Matt Malley on the album Sleepless Nights for World Village Records. His album Artistry recorded live in Kansas City with Manilal Nag on sitar, Ramesh Mishra on sarangi and Chatterjee on tabla  was nominated for a Grammy Award in 2002.

Awards and nominations
 Grammy Nomination for the album Artistry - 2002
 Just Plain Folk (JPF) Award Nomination for Bandish Fusion album - 2008
 Jadu Bhatta Award from Salt Lake Music Conference - 2006
 Honorary Citizenship from the State of Alabama (USA) - 2013

 SANGEET SAMMAN AWARD from West Bengal State Govt -2021

Discography

With Padmabhushan Smt. Girija Devi 

 PRATIKSHA [Sagarika] 	 
 SONGS FROM VARANASI [Nimbus Records] 	 
 INDE DU NORD (Live in Paris) [Occura Radio France] 	 
 SPRING MELODY [Mantra Records] 	 
 SAMADHI [Sony BMG] 	 
 With Pt. Vishwa Mohan Bhatt
 MOMENTS ( Dreamz Muzik) 	 
 SLEEPLESS NIGHTS (along with Matt Malley) [Harmonia Mundi] 	 
 BOUQUET OF RAGAS (WITH PT. VISWA MOHAN BHAT [PESHKAR INT'L] 	 
 With Ustad Shahid Parvez
 MORNING GLORY [Biswas Records] 	 
 EMOTIVE SITAR [Biswas Records] 	 
 INTIMATIONS OF GODDESS [Minds of Light] 	 
 DOUBLE CD ( LIVE IN TORONTO ) [India Music Club] 	 
 With Pt. Manilal Nag & Pt. Ramesh Mishra
 ARTISTRY (Sitar & Sarengi duet) [Rhyme Records]

With Budhaditya Mukherjee 

 SITAR [Biswas Records] 	 
 MAGIC MOMENTS [Sapphire Records]

With Pt. Manilal Nag & Ustad Ali Ahmed Hussain (Sitar & Sehnai Duet) 

 MUSIC FROM MAESTROS [Biswas Records] 	 
 JUGALBANDI [Rhyme Records] 	 
 SHEHNAI [B M G Records]

With KARMA - the fusion band 

 BANDISH FUSION: the lasting legacy [HMV SAREGAMA] 	 
 BANDISH FUSION: Redefind [HMV SAREGAMA] 	 
 BANDISH FUSION [Prime Music] 	 
 SECULAR MINDS [Plus Music] 	 
 BASICALLY YOURS [Megaphone Records] 	 
 BEYOND LIMIT [On Air Communications]

With Snehashish Mazumder (Mandolin) 

 ECLECTIC TRIO ( with Pt. Rupak Kulkarni ) ( Dreamz Muzik ) 	 
 MANDOLIN DREAMS [World Music Records] 	 
 RAINBOW [Neelam Records]

With Dr. Rajeeb Chakraborty 

 TRILOGY ( with Mr. Jesse Bannister ) ( Dreamz Muzik ) 	 
 BLACK & WHITE (RAJEEB & REENA: Sarode - Sitar duet) [On Air Communications] 	 
 SEASONS (with Rajeeb) [Rhyme Records] 	 
 CROSSWINDS (RAJEEB & JESSE BANNISTER: Sarode - Saxophone duet) [On Air Communications] 	 
 RAJEEB & REENA (Sarode - Sitar duet) [Neelam Records]
 	 
With Others

 DESERT ROOTS ( with The Langa Manganiyars of Rajasthan ) (Dreamz Muzik ) 	 
 BAUL EXPRESS ( with The Bauls of Bengal ) ( Dreamz Muzik ) 	 
 BLISS (Tabla Solo) [M2 Records] 	 
 EMOTIVE SARENGI (Pt. Ramesh Misra) [M2 Records] 	 
 SADHANA (Pt. Rajan & Sajan Misra- vocal duet) [PESHKAR INT'L] 	 
 LAGUK HAWA (With Rejwana Chowdhury Bonnya - An album on Rabindra Sangeet as World Music) [HMV SAREGAMA]

References

External links 
 

1963 births
Living people